Danny Mercer (born Daniel Murcia in Bogotá, Colombia) is a Colombian American recording artist, songwriter, and producer. Signed to Columbia Records, Murcia has worked with Afrojack, Akon, Celine Dion, Frankie J, Nicole Scherzinger, Pitbull, The Wanted, and will.i.am.

Career
Mercer was born Daniel Murcia in Bogotá, Colombia and moved to the US when he was 6 months old and grew up in Weston, Florida. Having shown an interest for music from an early age, he picked up a guitar at age 7 and started writing songs at 14. As a teenager growing up in Fort Lauderdale, Murcia studied with jazz pianist Alex Darqui at Lynn University, who expanded Murcia's musical horizons into jazz and fusion. While a freshman at Columbia University, Murcia began to produce and write songs in his dorm room, eventually sparking the attention of established pop songwriters and producers such as The Messengers and Kara DioGuardi.

Mercer made his commercial songwriting debut in 2012 with the release of Pitbull's Global Warming, to which he contributed several songs including "Have Some Fun" and  "Outta Nowhere". In 2013, he penned Frankie J's single "No Te Quiero Ver Con Él" in addition to collaborating with will.i.am and Sandy Vee to write Nicole Scherzinger's comeback single "Boomerang," which debuted at #6 on the UK charts. He also wrote and co-produced the track "Save Your Soul" on Celine Dion's 2013 album, Loved Me Back to Life. He performed on the television show Katie with Pitbull.

Murcia is currently working on his debut EP in addition to writing for other artists.

On May 31, 2013, Murcia performed live on Good Morning America with Pitbull and again on June 17, 2013, on The Tonight Show.

References 

Colombian songwriters
Male songwriters
Living people
Colombian emigrants to the United States
Colombian singer-songwriters
Year of birth missing (living people)
Columbia College (New York) alumni